Cello Sonata No. 3 may refer to:

 Cello Sonata No. 3 (Beethoven)
 Cello Sonata No. 3 (Ries)